Girl In The Shed: The Kidnapping Of Abby Hernandez is a Lifetime television network film that aired as part of its "Ripped from the Headlines" feature films and starring Lindsay Navarro, Ben Savage, and Erica Durance. It is based on the true story of the Kidnapping of Abby Hernandez at the hands of Nathaniel Kibby. The film premiered on Lifetime on February 26, 2022.

Plot

When she was 14 and days away from her 15th birthday, Abby Hernandez accepts a ride from a stranger while on her way home from school. This mistake results in her being kidnapped and held captive by Nathaniel Kibby. For 9 months, Nathaniel keeps her locked in a storage container located on his property and repeatedly abuses her. Abby carefully thinks of a plan to gain the trust of her abductor in order to survive and make it back home.

Meanwhile, her mother Zenya goes to the police to try to find Abby. When the police are unable to help her, Zenya takes action for her own search of Abby and struggles to keep up the hope of reuniting with her daughter.

Cast

Filming
Lindsay stated playing Abby in the film was emotionally and physically difficult.

Reception

References

2022 films
Crime films based on actual events
Drama films based on actual events
Films about abuse
Films about kidnapping
Films about kidnapping in the United States
Lifetime (TV network) films